Pinwheel is an American children's television show and the first to air on Nickelodeon, as well as the first to appear on Nickelodeon's Nick Jr. block. The show was aimed at preschoolers aged 3–5. It was created by Vivian Horner, an educator who spent her earlier career at the Children's Television Workshop, the company behind Sesame Street. The show was geared to the "short attention span of preschoolers," with each episode divided into short, self-contained segments including songs, skits, and animations.

The series is set in a boarding house called Pinwheel House, which is powered by a pinwheel on the roof. The house's residents are a mix of live-action humans and puppets. Most of the show's songs are set to music in the style of a wind-up music box.

Pinwheel premiered on December 1, 1977, on Channel C-3 of QUBE's local cable system in Columbus, Ohio. In April 1979, Channel C-3 expanded into a national television network, now called Nickelodeon. Pinwheel continued to air on the network until 1990. From 1988 to 1990, Pinwheel was aired exclusively during the then-new Nick Jr. block. It was gradually phased out in favor of another preschool series, Eureeka's Castle. The Los Angeles Times called Eureeka's Castle a successor series to Pinwheel.

History
Pinwheel was created by Vivian Horner and produced by Sandy Kavanaugh, two educators who had previously worked at the Children's Television Workshop. The show was created for QUBE, a local cable system tested in Columbus, Ohio. QUBE's developers wanted to offer a series for preschoolers, so they hired Horner and Kavanaugh based on their previous experience in preschool television. Beginning on December 1, 1977, Pinwheel was shown on Channel C-3, one of the experimental channels offered to QUBE subscribers. The channel was cited as "the world's first TV channel geared strictly to preschoolers."

In 1979, Channel C-3 was expanded into a national network called Nickelodeon. Pinwheel was reformatted as a series of hour-long episodes shown in three- to five-hour blocks, a format which eventually became the model for Nickelodeon's Nick Jr. block. There were a total of 260 Pinwheel episodes recorded from 1977 to 1984. For international distribution, Nickelodeon edited Pinwheel into a package of half-hour episodes. It aired in Canada on Superchannel (from 1983 to 1988) and TVOntario (from 1990 to 1993). The series was also broadcast in the United Kingdom whereas it aired on the defunct children's cable and satellite television network The Children's Channel during the 1980s and was even shown in a few Eurasian countries, including Channel 5 in Singapore, TV1 and TV2 in Malaysia and ATV World in Hong Kong as part of an afternoon programming block for children called Tube Time (which also plays several Nickelodeon and Nick Jr. shows such as Eureeka's Castle, Doug, Allegra's Window, Space Cases, Blue's Clues, Rugrats, and Hey Arnold!).

On January 4, 1988, Nickelodeon introduced the Nick Jr. block, a weekday morning block for preschoolers, to its schedule. Pinwheel was the first series that aired as part of the block. To promote Pinwheel on the block, Nickelodeon ran a series of commercials where the Nick Jr. logo took the shape of two pinwheels. Pinwheel continued to air as a staple of Nick Jr. until July 6, 1990, when the show aired its final rerun. Another puppet series for preschoolers, Eureeka's Castle, was made to replace it. In an article titled "Nickelodeon's New Lineup for Preschoolers," the Los Angeles Times called Eureeka's Castle the successor to Pinwheel.

Premise

The show takes place in and around a large Victorian-style boarding house called Pinwheel House, which is powered by a pinwheel on one of the peaks. Live actors interact with puppets, discussing various concepts familiar to children's programming like sharing, being considerate, the environment, and colors. All of the characters live and work in the various areas in and around the house. The Ohio episodes relied heavily on songs mostly performed by Jake.

Pinwheel underwent several changes when it moved to national television in 1979. Taping of Pinwheel moved to Matrix Studios in New York City, where the set was rebuilt. Arline Miyazaki, Betty Rozek, and Dale Engel joined the cast as Kim, Sal, and Smitty. Craig Marin and Olga Felgemacher created new puppet characters. Nickelodeon acquired a package of children's shorts from Coe Film Associates, which were shown as inserts between the show's usual puppet/human segments. These short films were also used as inserts for other early Nickelodeon shows, including Hocus Focus and By the Way.

Characters

Humans
The characters are ordered per the first season credits, with later cast members added to the end.
 Franci (Franci Anderson) - a storyteller who likes to write and perform in plays. She keeps a terrarium that houses a group of small alien marionettes called the Wonkles. She likes to sketch pictures as she tells stories. She only appeared in the first season.
 Coco (Caroline Cox Loveheart from 1977 to 1979, Lindanell Rivera from 1979 to 1984) - a Parisian mime who never speaks and has a knack for fixing things. She often hosts her own segments, performing magic tricks and mime routines while an off-screen narrator describes her actions.
 Jake (George James) - a boarder who enjoys music. He collects unusual sounds in small boxes and opens them up whenever he needs musical inspiration. He keeps a wide variety of musical instruments in his room, and he displays them unconventionally on a coatrack.
 Smitty (Dale Engle) and Sal (Betty Rozek) - an elderly couple who run a local newspaper called The Daily Noodle. One of Smitty's long-running obsessions is to capture a photograph of the elusive Admiral Bird for the front page of the Daily Noodle, though he constantly misses his chance.
 Kim (Arline Miyazaki) - Aurelia's niece who is the resident artist of Pinwheel House. She is commonly seen wearing a painter's smock and carrying a painting palette. In addition to painting, she sometimes makes sculptures.

Puppets
 Aurelia - a bohemian-style character who is the owner and mother figure of Pinwheel House. She has a ginger bob, olive green eyes, fuchsia lips and wears colorful head scarfs and large hoop earrings. She is friendly and bubbly, but firm and sometimes full of herself. She works as a fortune teller and has a touch-tone crystal ball that works like a telephone.
 Ebenezer T. Squint - a green-skinned inventor and part-time magician who talks in a nasal voice. He lives in a basement storage room where he makes machines and conspires to be featured in Smitty's newspaper. He pretends to be antisocial, but he secretly enjoys being included in the house activities. In his words, he loves to play as "the villain" and cause trouble for no good reason. He has collections of dust and weeds. His role is similar to that of Oscar the Grouch.
 Luigi O'Brien - an Italian produce vendor who runs a small food stand in the backyard of the boarding house. He has a happy-go-lucky, relaxed attitude and is often a source of advice. All of his produce items talk, sing, and have individual personalities, but they are only known by their respective fruit and vegetable names (Pear, Tomato, etc.).
 Plus and Minus - Aurelia's twin nephews who live in the attic room. The color schemes for the twins were the exact opposite, with Plus having black hair and orange skin and Minus with white hair and purple skin. Minus is very upbeat and enthusiastic, while Plus is more thoughtful and easily discouraged. A recurring sketch is Plus's attempt to board a spaceship to the moon, and Minus distracting him and causing him to miss the take-off. Their favorite game is "Gotcha Last," a combination of tag and hide-and-seek. Their roles are similar to those of Bert and Ernie.
 Molly the Mole - an elderly mole who lives in a tree in the backyard and often introduces cartoon shorts in the form of telling stories. She is sometimes visited by another mole named Leo.
 The Admiral Bird - a bright red bird marionette who is known for being elusive and hard to catch. He often drops from the sky with a strange, echoing call. It is Smitty's dream to capture a picture of the Admiral Bird for his newspaper, but he never succeeds. The Admiral Bird enjoys teasing Smitty.
 Silas the Snail - an elderly snail who is constantly on his way to an annual snail gathering. He never makes it further than the back garden due to snails being so slow. He extolls the virtues of slowing down and enjoying life, telling people that "half the fun is getting there."
 The Hobo Bugs - a brother-and-sister pair of marionettes named Herbert and Lulu. They like to dance and play on the hedges in the backyard, and they often visit Luigi's produce stand to ask for special items, such as an impossible pair of custom sandals that Luigi somehow manages to produce. They also love to play with Ebenezer, who typically tells them to leave him alone in a grumpy manner, even though he really enjoys their company.
 The Wonkles - a group of alien marionettes from the planet Zintar who live in Franci's garden terrarium. Three of them are bird-like: Tika (yellow and pink), Gorkle (blue), and Woofle (red). A fourth Wonkle, an abstract-looking green creature named Sorbin, also visits occasionally. They were retired from the show along with Franci and Spiderbelle in 1979.
 Spiderbelle - a purple spider marionette who wears a bonnet. She was retired from the show along with Franci and the Wonkles in 1979.

Reception
The New York Times wrote that Pinwheel had "attracted praise from critics," and The Chicago Tribune called the show a "highly acclaimed Nickelodeon cable series for preschoolers." Writing for The New York Times in 1982, Alexis Greene commended Pinwheel for catering specifically to preschoolers and called the show "a colorful, well-written mix of songs and skits, puppets and 'real people.'"

International Aired
  : ORF III
  : FR3, then France 3
  : ZDF
  : RTÉ One
  : Rai Uno
  : Nickelodeon
  : BBC One

References

Works cited

External links

1977 American television series debuts
1984 American television series endings
American television shows featuring puppetry
1970s American children's television series
1980s American children's television series
1970s Nickelodeon original programming
1980s Nickelodeon original programming
American preschool education television series
1970s preschool education television series
1980s preschool education television series
Television shows filmed in Ohio
Television shows filmed in New York (state)
American television series with live action and animation
Personal development television series
English-language television shows